Criibacterium is a monotypic genus of bacteria in the family Peptostreptococcaceae. The only described species is Criibacterium bergeronii.

References

Monotypic bacteria genera
Peptostreptococcaceae
Bacteria described in 2021